Caroline Laura Rice (June 20, 1819 – August 29, 1899) was an American teacher, writer, composer, and social reformer.

Biography
She was born June 20, 1819 in Torrington, Connecticut, the daughter of William North and Laura Hyde North. Her parents moved to Great Falls, New Hampshire and then to Lowell, Massachusetts during her childhood. Her father was superintendent of the dyeing department at Middlesex Mills. 
She attended Wilbraham Wesleyan Academy.

She taught in the public schools of Lowell.  
She was president of the Soldiers Aid Association during the Civil War, and the second president of the Springfield Home for Friendless Women and Children in the 1870s. She was also active in the women's club. 
She was an avid writer. She wrote at least two hymns, "I builded Rock, on the Rock of God," and "Wilt thou hear the voice of praise." "Wilt thou hear the voice of praise," was included in the Methodist hymnal. 

She was very active in the Trinity Methodist Church in Springfield, Massachusetts. 
She married Rev. William Rice (1821–1897) on September 13, 1843. They had four children, including a daughter named Caroline Laura Rice.

She died August 29, 1899 in the home of her son, Rev. Dr. Charles Francis Rice in Springfield.

References

American social reformers
American hymnwriters
1819 births
1899 deaths
People from Torrington, Connecticut
Women hymnwriters